Erysiphe cichoracearum  is a fungal plant pathogen that causes powdery mildew disease of cucurbits, including melon, cucumber, pumpkin, and squash. The primary symptoms are white, powder-like spots on the leaves and stems. Sphaerotheca fuliginea causes a similar looking powdery mildew of cucurbits.

References

External links

 Powdery Mildew of Cucurbits

Fungal plant pathogens and diseases
Fruit and vegetable pathogens and diseases
cicnoracearum
Fungi described in 1805